Exit is the studio album by Shugo Tokumaru. It was originally released via P-Vine Records on October 19, 2007 in Japan. It peaked at number 239 on the Oricon Albums Chart.

Background
Tokumaru plays more than fifty different instruments on the album, and claims that he "drew inspiration" for its music from Japanese pop and a pile of old Beatles cassettes. Both of these were very influential music styles. He attained the album's experimental sound using everyday household objects such as a fork, ashtray, doorbell, wind-up toys; along with more traditional instruments such as acoustic guitar and wooden flutes. Most or all of the instruments were played in major key in a clipped, almost clockwork cadence. The album was mixed and recorded on his laptop, using the popular digital audio program Pro Tools.

Critical reception

At Metacritic, which assigns a weighted average score out of 100 to reviews from mainstream critics, Exit received an average score of 88 based on 7 reviews, indicating "universal acclaim".

The Boston Globes Matthew Shaer praised Exit as "a tribute to the unexpected beauty of everyday things" and "a defense of playful digression for digression's sake alone". Chris Dahlen of Pitchfork wrote, "[Tokumaru is] gently mining 1960s pop from around the globe and capturing it with a soft production and a sense of humor." Dan Raper of PopMatters said, "Irrespective of biography and language, the album has a sunny, refreshing optimism that hardly feels out of date." In UR Chicago, Bob Nanna wrote that the "curious whimsy" of opener "Parachute" is enough to "beg repeat listens and intense curiosity for what's to come".

Track listing

Personnel
Credits adapted from liner notes.

 Shugo Tokumaru – all audio
 Itoken – drums (on "Clocca" and "La La Radio")
 Kei Tanaka – double bass (on "Clocca" and "La La Radio")
 Yumiko – accordion (on "La La Radio")
 Machida Shizen Kindergarten – chorus (on "Button")
 Mandy Parnell – mastering

Charts

Release history

References

External links
 

2007 albums
Shugo Tokumaru albums
P-Vine Records albums
Startime International albums